Blu or BLU may refer to:

Businesses and brands
Blu (Italian company), a telecommunications company
Blu Manga, an imprint of Tokyopop
blu eCigs, a brand of electronic cigarette owned by Imperial Tobacco
BLU Products, an American mobile phone manufacturer

Fictional entities
Blu (Monica's Gang), from the Brazilian comic strip
Quadra Blu, from Max Rep comics
Blu, from the Rio franchise
BLU, a playable faction in Team Fortress 2 video game

People
Blu (artist), Italian artist
Blu (rapper) (Johnson Barnes III, born 1983), American rapper
David Blu (David Bluthenthal, born 1980), American–Israeli basketball player
Françoise Ballet-Blu (born 1964), French politician
Susan Blu (Susan Maria Blue, born 1948), American voice actress and casting director
Blu Cantrell (born 1976), American singer
Blu del Barrio (born 1997), American actor
Blu Greenberg (Bluma Genauer, born 1936), American writer

Other uses
Bomb Live Unit, a munition, see:

See also

Blue (disambiguation)
Blu-ray, a digital optical disc data storage format
Blu Tack, a reusable putty-like pressure-sensitive adhesive
TheBlu, digital media franchise founded in 2011
Radisson Blu, a hotel brand